This is a list of Kentucky Wildcats basketball players who have attained notability through their performance in the sport of basketball and other endeavors. The list includes over 150 current and former players.  The list is presented in alphabetical order but is sortable by the years and positions at which they played.

Key

List of current and former players

References 

 
Kentucky Wildcats basketball players